Zarrineh is a city in Kurdistan Province, Iran

Zarrineh may also refer to:
 Zarneh, Ilam Province
 Zarrineh, Qorveh, Kurdistan Province
 Zarrineh-ye Varmazyar, Kurdistan Province
 Zarrineh Rural District, in Kurdistan Province